Martha Lewis may refer to:
 Martha Lewis (skipjack), listed on the NRHP in Maryland
 Martha S. Lewis (1924–2007), African American government official and social worker
 Martha D Lewis (born 1967), British-born Cypriot recording artist

Lewis, Martha